Zeus is a fictional deity in the DC Comics universe, an interpretation of Zeus from Greek mythology. His appearances are most significant in stories of Wonder Woman (Princess Diana). With the 2011 relaunch of DC Comics dubbed The New 52, Zeus has received a prominent role in the Wonder Woman mythos, as he is now the biological father of Wonder Woman through Hippolyta.

Fictional character biography
Zeus' origins and early history mostly conform to the way they are presented in classical mythology. He is a child of the Titans Cronus and Rhea and leader of the twelve Olympian Gods. During a war between the Titans and Olympians, Zeus slays his father and assumes his place as King of the Gods, ruling from Mount Olympus with his sister-wife Hera. He is the father of numerous gods and heroes, the most famous being Hercules.

In the DC Universe, the machinations of the alien dark and demon god Darkseid when he spreads tales of the Roman Gods cause the Olympians to split into multiple aspects, with the Roman gods existing for a time as separate entities. Zeus' counterpart Jupiter rules his own Olympus in a separate dimension following this. The two pantheons are merged into single entities again centuries later.

In present day, Zeus has been a benefactor of the Amazons, the last remaining people that still worship the Olympians. However, his patriarchal attitudes, disregard for mortals, and unreasonable demands have sometimes led to conflict with his followers, particularly their champion Wonder Woman.

After Wonder Woman's defeat of Ares, which caused the latter to go into self-exile, Zeus becomes interested in Diana and wants her virginity, offering to make her a goddess. Diana becomes the first woman ever to refuse his advances while professing love for him as god and father. Enraged at being rejected, Zeus threatens her, but is summoned back to Olympus by Hera at the urging at the Goddesses who created the Amazons and are incensed themselves at Zeus for trying to make Themyscira his personal brothel. As punishment, Zeus demands that Diana undertake the Challenge of the Gods, on which she defeats the evils that have been trapped under Paradise Island, including a Hecatonshire and the Lernaean Hydra. She frees Heracles, who had been turned to stone and was supporting the Island.

During a War of the Gods, Zeus leads the Olympians in a conflict with their Roman counterparts and other deities, until mortal heroes intervene to end the war. After Darkseid destroys the glory of Olympus, Zeus convinces the other gods to abandon both it and Earth, and only Hermes refuses. The gods later return to Olympus but have occasionally been forced to defend or relocate it.

As in classical myth, Zeus frequently cheats on his wife Hera and couples with mortals to produce demi-god offspring. Zeus has been revealed as the father of Wonder Girl (Cassie Sandsmark) and shares a complicated relationship with his daughter, who resents his absence from most of her life.

Zeus is briefly deposed as ruler of Olympus during a coup staged by his daughter Athena with help from Ares. In the wake of this conflict, Athena becomes Queen of the Gods and Ares is appointed Lord of the Underworld. Shortly after this, the gods enter their second exile, following the Amazons into another dimension after the events of the Infinite Crisis. Their return to the Earth-realm is brought about by Darkseid, who captures the Olympians and tampers with their memories, seeking the secrets of their power. In Countdown to Final Crisis Darkseid's New Gods pose as Olympians and manipulate their followers. Once freed from Darkseid, the old Olympian order is restored. Athena seemingly perishes from her sustained injuries and Zeus once again becomes King of the Gods, giving Mary Marvel her powers back after she frees the Gods from a chamber on Apokolips.

Zeus' manipulations of his followers finally come to a head with the creation of the Gargareans, a race of warriors intended as male counterparts of the Amazons. Zeus murders the Hawaiian god Kāne Milohai, a patron of Wonder Woman, and uses his heart to resurrect Achilles Warkiller, whom he appoints as leader of the Gargareans. Zeus also instates Achilles as the new ruler of Themyscira. When Wonder Woman learns of this and of the murder of Kāne, she becomes enraged and physically assaults Zeus. This blasphemy shocks her mother Hippolyta and leads Diana to enter self-exile.

In The New 52 reboot, Wonder Woman's origin is revised, with her now being the biological daughter of Zeus. Zeus and Hippolyta engaged in combat, and their fight ended with the couple having sex, and thus Diana was conceived. This encounter was hidden from Diana, who was raised to believe that she was born out of clay, in order to protect Diana from Hera (Zeus' wife). Lennox (another illegitimate offspring of Zeus) commented that Zeus has been "scarpered off the immortal coil", hinting that he has apparently died. It is revealed that Zeus was reborn as a baby by his daughter Athena (much as Zeus had given birth to her from his head) who had been plunged into the fictitious personality and matching body of a woman named Zola who believed Zeke to be her youngest son by Zeus. Fulfilling the prophecy involving Zeus's last born son, Zeke is revealed to be the king of the gods himself, and the spell on Athena ends. Wonder Woman pleads with Athena, however, to vacate this form she has created so Wonder Woman can keep her friend Zola and mother to the new baby Zeus, who could be a better king of the gods with Zola as the mother he never really had before in his life.

Powers and abilities
Depending on the writer, Zeus' powers require either direct or indirect worship to sustain them. Without this worship his powers may fade over time allowing other gods to equal or surpass him.

In most stories, Zeus is one of or the most powerful Olympian god. He has vast supernatural powers with a focus on weather control, but can accomplish nearly anything including shapeshifting, resurrecting the dead, and creating new life.

In other media

Television
 Zeus appears in the Challenge of the Super Friends episode "Battle of the Gods", voiced by Bob Holt. Due to a dispute between Aphrodite praising the Super Friends and Hera becoming jealous over it, Zeus asks the Super Friends to settle the matter by partaking in different trials.

Film
 Zeus makes a cameo appearance in Wonder Woman (2009), voiced by David McCallum.
 Zeus appears in films set in the DC Extended Universe. This version is the biological father of Diana Prince / Wonder Woman.
 First appearing in flashbacks depicted in Wonder Woman (2017) via CGI effects, he created the Amazons to protect and help mankind, but his son Ares revolted to corrupt mankind, killing his fellow Olympians in the process. Zeus defeated Ares and cast him from Mount Olympus, but suffered fatal wounds. Nevertheless, he created Themyscira to protect the Amazons, cloaked it from the world, and gave them the "god-killer" sword and conceives Diana with Hippolyta to help them slay Ares should he return.
 Zeus appears in flashbacks depicted in Justice League, portrayed by Spanish bodybuilder Sergi Constance. He leads the Olympians in fighting alongside the Amazons, Atlanteans, mankind, and Earth's then-active Green Lantern in fighting Steppenwolf's forces before separating the Mother Boxes so the united forces can scatter them across the world to prevent their reassembly. In the director's cut, Zeus assisted Ares in fighting Darkseid.

Video games
Zeus appears in DC Universe Online.

References

External links
 Zeus at DC Comics Wiki

Characters created by George Pérez
Comics characters introduced in 1944
DC Comics characters who are shapeshifters
DC Comics characters who can move at superhuman speeds
DC Comics characters who can teleport
DC Comics characters who use magic
DC Comics characters with superhuman strength
DC Comics deities
DC Comics male characters
Fictional characters with electric or magnetic abilities
Fictional characters with weather abilities
Fictional characters with energy-manipulation abilities
Fictional characters with death or rebirth abilities
Fictional characters with immortality
Fictional characters with superhuman durability or invulnerability
Fictional characters who can change size
Fictional gods
Fictional murderers
Fictional rapists
Classical mythology in DC Comics
Greek and Roman deities in fiction
Wonder Woman characters
Zeus